Nicholas Andrew Esasky (born February 24, 1960), is a former Major League Baseball first baseman and third baseman. During his career, which spanned just over seven and a half years and was spent mostly with the Cincinnati Reds (1983–1988), the former first-round draft pick in 1978 hit .250 with 122 home runs and 427 runs batted in.

Though he twice hit more than 20 home runs in a season with the Reds, his best statistical year came in 1989 as a member of the Boston Red Sox to whom he was traded along with relief pitcher Rob Murphy for switch-hitting first baseman/outfielder Todd Benzinger and pitcher Jeff Sellers. During that season, he hit .277 with 30 home runs and 108 runs batted in. That offseason, as a free agent, Esasky signed a three-year, $5.6 million contract with the Atlanta Braves, but was forced to retire after playing just nine games due to developing vertigo stemming from an ear infection.  His salary was paid for by insurance.

As of 2021, Esasky is running a health and wellness center near his hometown of Hialeah, Florida.

References

External links

Living people
1960 births
Atlanta Braves players
Boston Red Sox players
Cincinnati Reds players
Baseball players from Florida
Major League Baseball first basemen
Major League Baseball third basemen
Billings Mustangs players
Tampa Tarpons (1957–1987) players
Waterbury Reds players
Nashville Sounds players
Indianapolis Indians players
Richmond Braves players
People from Hialeah, Florida
Miami Carol City Senior High School alumni